was a Japanese seinen manga magazine published on a monthly basis by Gentosha's imprint Birz Comics from 1986 until 2018. The magazine was called Comic Burger (コミックバーガー), until it was renamed in 1996. Several manga that were being published in the magazine were moved to the Denshi Birz website after its cancellation in 2018.

Serializations
888
Akaten Hero!
Arm of Kannon
Atagoul by Hiroshi Masumura (1994-1996)
Beast of East
Blood Sucker
Bushidō
Butterfly
Category: Freaks
Chalk
Chi to Hone
Chibisan Date
Cosmos Rakuenki by Hiroshi Masumura (1986-1989)
Doro Neko 9
Drug-On
Garakua Street
Genei Hakurankai
Giga Tokyo Toy Box
Hakase no Sekai
Hetalia: Axis Powers
Hinata no Ookami - Shinsengumi Kidan
Kachikujin Yapō
Karasuma Kyoko no Jikenbo
Kimi no Unaji ni Kanpai!
Kirikiritei no Buraun Sensei
Kochūdou Nidaime Shujin Monogatari Tenjou no Me
Konohana Kitan
Kyosūrei
Kyou Kara Yonshiami
Lament of the Lamb
Meikyuu Hyakunen no Suima
Mikoto to Miko to
Mimitsuki
Monochrome Cube
The Music of Marie (Marie no Kanaderu Ongaku) by Usamaru Furuya (2000-2001)
Necromanesque
Opera no Kaijin
Otome Yōkai Zakuro
Pied Piper
Quo Vadis
Rappa - Rannami
Rasu Bosu
Red Garden
Reincarnated as a Sword
Ringlet
Rozen Maiden
Sengoku Zombie
Senome
Shakkin Kanojo
Shikao Ao ni Yoshi
Souldrop no Yuutai Kenkyuu
Subete ga F ni Naru
The Sword of Shibito
Taimashin
Take It Easy by Kyoko Okazaki (1986-1987)
Tokyo Red Hood
Tōkei Ibun
Tumetai Misshitsu to Hakasetachi
Under the Rose - Haru no Sanka
Wizards Nation
Yurikuma Arashi

References

1986 establishments in Japan
2018 disestablishments in Japan
Defunct magazines published in Japan
Gentosha
Magazines established in 1986
Magazines disestablished in 2018
Magazines published in Tokyo
Monthly manga magazines published in Japan
Seinen manga magazines